Kuhchenar County is in Fars province, Iran. The capital of the county is the city of Qaemiyeh. At the 2006 census, the region's population (as Chenar Shahijan District and Kuhmareh District of Kazerun County) was 61,610 in 13,378 households. The following census in 2011 counted 60,555 people in 15,635 households. At the 2016 census, the districts' population was 61,717 in 17,283 households. The districts were separated from Kazerun County in 2018 to become Kuhchenar County.

Administrative divisions

The population history of Kuhchenar County's administrative divisions over three consecutive censuses is shown in the following table.

References

Counties of Fars Province